The Ingraham Building is a historic site in Miami, Florida. It is located at 25 Southeast 2nd Avenue. On January 4, 1989, it was added to the U.S. National Register of Historic Places.

References

External links

 
 
 
 Dade County listings at National Register of Historic Places
 Florida's Office of Cultural and Historical Programs
 Dade County listings
 Ingraham Building

Buildings and structures in Miami
National Register of Historic Places in Miami